Mesquite Hills is a newly developing neighborhood in Northeast El Paso, Texas. Newman Ranch Partners, LLC, began construction of the community in 2007, as demand for housing in the area increased.  This increase in housing demand can be attributed to the relocation of tens of thousands of U.S. Soldiers from Germany to nearby Fort Bliss.  At full build out, Mesquite Hills will have approximately 1,774 single family homes.  There are also plans for four neighborhood parks to be located within Mesquite Hills.  Plans call for commercial plots along U.S. 54 to the north and Dyer street to the south.  Newman Ranch Partners initially were in negotiations with the Ysleta Independent School District to include an elementary school in Mesquite Hills, however a bond proposal was voted down by voters, and the elementary school will not be built.  Newman Ranch Partners will now build more housing where the school was to be built.

Many local home builders are building homes in Mesquite Hills to include: Classic American Homes, Zia Homes, Accent Homes, Bic Homes, CareFree homes, Joseph Homes, and Edwards Homes.  In the initial building of Mesquite Hills, homes were sold in the $90s, however, the community is still appealing to first time home buyers with homes currently listed in the low $110s.

Mesquite Hills is serviced by the Ysleta Independent School District.  The community's schools are currently zones within the Parkland High School, Parkland Middle School, and Deseraire Elementary School boundaries.

There have been a couple local news articles which discuss the "stench" from the nearby water treatment plant.  When winds blow from the East, a very strong and pungent odor have had residents complaining for years. 

To access Mesquite Hills, take US 54 North and take the Sean Haggerty Exit.  Stay on the access road until you pass McCombs.  After passing McCombs, you will see the subdivision about 5 minutes after that (to your right). There is an open desert area prior to reaching Mesquite Hills.

Neighborhoods in El Paso, Texas